Fredericton Junction (2016 population: 704) is a Canadian village in Sunbury County, New Brunswick.

History

The community was originally named Hartt's Mills but was renamed in 1869 when the European and North American Railway (Western Extension) was opened between Saint John and Vanceboro, Maine, meeting the Fredericton Branch Railway which ran from this junction into Fredericton.

Demographics 

Notable people

See also
List of communities in New Brunswick

References

Communities in Sunbury County, New Brunswick
Villages in New Brunswick